John Keep Boies (December 6, 1828August 21, 1891) was an American politician.

Early life
John K. Boies was born on December 6, 1828 in Blandford, Massachusetts to parents Lemuel and Experience Boies. John moved to Hudson, Michigan in 1845.

Career
Boies served as village president of Hudson Village for two terms. On November 8, 1864, Boies was elected to the Michigan House of Representatives where he represented the Lenawee County 1st district from January 4, 1865 to December 31, 1868. On November 3, 1868, Boies was elected to the Michigan Senate where he represented the 8th district from January 6, 1869 to December 31, 1870. On November 3, 1874, Boies was elected to the Michigan Senate where he represented the 6th district from January 6, 1875 to December 31, 1876. During his last term in the state senate, Boies served as president pro tempore of the chamber. In 1881, Boies was appointed to the Board of Indian Commissioners by U.S. President James A. Garfield. He served on this board until his resignation on January 15, 1886.

Death
Boies died on August 21, 1891 in Washington, D.C. Boies was interred at Maple Grove Cemetery in Hudson.

References

1828 births
1891 deaths
Burials in Michigan
Garfield administration personnel
People from Blandford, Massachusetts
People from Hudson, Michigan
Republican Party Michigan state senators
Republican Party members of the Michigan House of Representatives
19th-century American politicians